Polonoceras is a genus included in the goniatitid subfamily Aulatornoceratinae named by Dybczynski, 1913.  The type species  is Polonoceras planum Dybczynski.
According to Miller, et al. in the American Treatise on Invertebrate Paleontology, 1957, Polonoceras is a subgenus of Tornoceras.

Polonoceras, which lived during the Late Devonian, has an involute or moderately evolute, discoidal shell with a high aperture and flattened, grooved venter.  The adventitious lobe, next to the ventral lobe, is widely rounded, the Ventro-lateral saddle narrow and sometimes higher than lateral saddle.

Polonoceras is found in Europe, in Poland, where it was discovered.  It is also reported from Upper Devonian (middle Famennian) in Canning Basin, Western Australia.

References

Polonoceras in GONIAT Online 6/10/12
The Paleobiology Database Polonoceras entry accessed 10 June 2012

Late Devonian ammonites
Goniatitida genera
Tornoceratidae
Ammonites of Australia
Famennian life
Famennian genus first appearances
Famennian genus extinctions